Jackie James Barnes (born 4 February 1986) is an Australian drummer and singer. He has been performing since the age of four and has appeared on over 60 releases since 1990. He is the third child and only son of Jimmy Barnes and his wife Jane.

Early life
Born in Sydney on 4 February 1986, he was the third child and only son of Jimmy Barnes and his wife Jane. His half-brother is Jimmy Barnes' oldest child, singer and actor David Campbell. Jackie Barnes was born while his father was touring the US with ZZ Top and named after soul singer Jackie Wilson. Within days of his birth, his mother took him and his sisters to America to join their father on tour. He is of Thai and Scottish origin.

When he was four, he joined older sisters Eliza-Jane 'E.J.' and Mahalia for the recording sessions of their father's Two Fires album. Their voices are among the children's choir that features on the track "When Your Love is Gone".

From the age of five he formed part of the children's singing group the Tin Lids (after Glaswegian rhyming slang for "kids") with sisters Eliza-Jane 'E.J.', Elly-May and Mahalia. The Tin Lids recorded three albums between 1991 and 1994, all of which achieved platinum sales. One of their albums, Snakes & Ladders (1992), was nominated for the ARIA Award for Best Children's Album in 1993.

After finishing high school, Barnes began touring with Jimmy Barnes as keyboardist. In 2005, Barnes successfully auditioned for the position of drummer and backing vocalist in that same band. He recorded the song "Same Woman" as a duet with father on the 2005 album Double Happiness that topped the ARIA charts. Since then he has been able to work with artists including his uncles John Swan and Diesel, Keith Urban, Jonathan Cain, Neal Schon, Steve Morse, Joe Bonamassa, Andrew Roachford, Steve Van Zandt, The Dead Daisies, Shannon Noll, The Wiggles and Glenn Hughes.

In 2010 he graduated with a Bachelor of Music majoring in drum performance at Berklee College of Music in Boston, Massachusetts, US. At Berklee he studied with Kenwood Dennard, Eguie Castrillo, Rod Morgenstein and Dave DiCenso.

Jackie recorded the drums on the 2007 Jimmy Barnes album Out in the Blue as well as on the DVD Max Sessions- Live at the Sydney Opera House and then in 2008 he played drums on the Jimmy Barnes Live at the Enmore DVD.

In 2013, Jackie toured worldwide with Australian classical/pop group the Ten Tenors playing over 100 shows to audiences in Europe, USA, Canada, Thailand and Australia. After touring with the Ten Tenors, Jackie joined Los Angeles based rock outfit Heaven and Earth and toured Europe extensively. 2014 saw Jackie join third series winner Reece Mastin on his Wolf in the Woods tour around Australia as well as recording and touring father Jimmy Barnes' album 30:30 Hindsight, a collaborative album to commemorate Jimmy's 30th year as a solo performer. Jackie also collaborated with singer-songwriter Alys on a duo project called Chance Carousel, with a debut EP scheduled for release in mid 2015. He also recorded the drums on Alys' debut EP due out in 2015.
In early 2015 Jackie joined rock supergroup the Dead Daisies to record their album Revoluciòn. Jackie also started working with legendary children's music group the Wiggles, recording drums on all of their releases since 2016, including the ARIA nominated Duets album. For his work on the Jimmy Barnes/Wiggles collaboration Och Aye the G'nu, Jackie won the ARIA Award for Best Children's Album. Around this time Jackie also started touring with Australian singer Shannon Noll.

Since 2015, Jackie has been the drummer for Australian blues/funk band the Lachy Doley Group. In August 2018, Jackie joined Rose Tattoo for the band's European Tour.

References

External links
 Official website

Living people
1986 births
Australian rock drummers
Male drummers
Berklee College of Music alumni
Australian people of Scottish-Jewish descent
Australian people of Thai descent
Musicians from Sydney
Australian child singers
Swan musical family
Rose Tattoo members
21st-century Australian singers
21st-century drummers
21st-century Australian male singers
Australian children's musicians